Holy Cross Cemetery  is a cemetery located in the Chollas View neighborhood of San Diego, California.

Holy Cross was dedicated in 1919 for the exclusive use of Roman Catholics, with expansions in 1945 and 1956. The mausoleum, with its distinctive blue roof visible from California State Route 94, is a landmark of San Diego.

Notable interments
 Elliott Buckmaster (1889–1976) American naval officer and Naval Aviator
 Charles F. Buddy (1887–1936), first bishop of the Roman Catholic Diocese of San Diego
 Andrew Cunanan (1969–1997), spree killer, most notable for his murder of Gianni Versace
 Johnny Downs (1913–1994), actor
 William Gargan (1905–1979), actor
 Charlotte Henry (1914–1980), actress
 Leo Thomas Maher (1915–1991), third bishop of the Roman Catholic Diocese of San Diego
 Anita Page (1910–2008), actress
 Lewis D. Thill (1903–1975), Wisconsin congressmen

References

External links
 Journal of San Diego History – San Diego Cemeteries: A Brief Guide
 

Cemeteries in San Diego County, California
Roman Catholic cemeteries in California
Geography of San Diego
1919 establishments in California
History of San Diego